Patrick Poutiainen (born 14 June 1991) is a Finnish football player currently playing for Kokkolan Palloveikot.

References

External links
 Guardian Football
 

Living people
1991 births
Finnish footballers
JJK Jyväskylä players
Veikkausliiga players
Kokkolan Palloveikot players
Association football midfielders
Sportspeople from Jyväskylä
21st-century Finnish people